WNM may refer to:

Science and technology
 Warm Neutral Medium, a component of the interstellar medium of the Milky Way
 West Nile meningitis, a neurological disease caused by the West Nile virus
 Wireless Network Management, of the IEEE 802.11v standard

Military
 Washington Naval Militia, a defunct military reserve of the United States Navy
 Wisconsin Naval Militia, a defunct military reserve of the United States Navy

Other uses
 Writers News Manitoba, the former name of the Canadian literary magazine Prairie Fire
 Weston Milton railway station (Station code), a railway station in Weston-super-Mare, North Somerset, England
 Windsor station (Vermont) (Station code), a train station in Windsor, Vermont, United States
 Wednesday Night Memorial Social Club, Venice, California, United States